A list of active collegiate chapters and colonies of Delta Zeta sorority.

Chapters

Canada

Colonies

United States

References

Delta Zeta
Delta Zeta